"Stay Together" is a 2006 single by the Polish singer and dancer Mandaryna.

Background
It was her first ballad released as a single. "Stay Together" was written by Harald Reitinger. The song was performed at various festivals in Poland in 2006. The music video was shot in the summer 2006 in Ukraine and features Mandaryna singing with a children choir. The video was released on Polish music video stations on September 12, 2006. "Stay Together" was released as a non-album single and meant to be on Mandaryna's third studio album, Third Time: Mandaryna4You, which remains unreleased.

Track listing
Promotional CD Single
Oryginal Radio Edit
Tony K Remix
East Clubbers Acustik Ver.
Discobusters Remix
East Clubbers Lite Mouse Remix
Remix Symfoniczny Radek Barczak

References

2006 singles
Mandaryna songs
2006 songs